In the aftermath of the 2003 invasion of Iraq and the subsequent sectarian violence a number of terrorist attacks have targeted the Sadr City district of Baghdad.

These include but are not limited to 

1 July 2006 Sadr City bombing
23 November 2006 Sadr City bombings
24 June 2009 Baghdad bombing
 2015 Baghdad market truck bomb